The 2002 Czech Republic motorcycle Grand Prix was the tenth round of the 2002 MotoGP Championship. It took place on the weekend of 23–25 August 2002 at the Masaryk Circuit located in Brno, Czech Republic. This event would be the last podium for Japanese MotoGP rider, Daijiro Kato; who finished in second place, before his death on 20 April 2003 following an accident at the 2003 Japanese Grand Prix.

MotoGP classification

250 cc classification

125 cc classification

Championship standings after the race (MotoGP)

Below are the standings for the top five riders and constructors after round ten has concluded.

Riders' Championship standings

Constructors' Championship standings

 Note: Only the top five positions are included for both sets of standings.

References

Czech Republic motorcycle Grand Prix
Czech Republic
Motorcycle Grand Prix